Air Chief Marshal Chalit Pukbhasuk PC (5 April 1948 –) is a retired Thai air force officer, a commander of the Royal Thai Air Force, and the acting chairman of Council for National Security, the junta that overthrew the government of former Prime Minister Thaksin Shinawatra in the 2006 coup d'état.

Biography
Chalit graduated from the Royal Thai Air Force Academy and held many key positions in the Air Force, including that of air attaché in Jakarta.  Prior to becoming Commander of the Air Force, he was the Air Force's chief of staff. Chalit was reportedly reluctant to support the 2006 Thai coup d'état – Royal Thai Army troops had surrounded Air Force Headquarters on the night of the coup to ensure that Chalit and the Air Force did not provide any resistance.

Chalit was appointed a deputy chairman in the Council for National Security under coup leader, General Sonthi Boonyaratglin. Chalit was paid nearly 114,000 baht per month as an additional salary to his air force pay while he was deputy chairman.

Chalit was named as acting chairman of the Council for National Security on 1 October 2007, succeeding Sonthi, who retired from military duty to enter politics. In addition to his duties as air force chief and acting CNS head, Chalit also serves as chairman of the board of Thai Airways International. In 2011, Chalit was appointed by Bhumibol Adulyadej to Privy Council of Thailand.

Chalit is married to Assistant professor Dr. Phonthip Phukphasuk, a now retired professor for Thai language from the Faculty of Arts of  Chulalongkorn University. They have two daughters.

References

|-

|-

|-

Living people
1948 births
Chalit Pukbhasuk
Chalit Pukbhasuk
Chalit Pukbhasuk
Chalit Pukbhasuk
Chalit Pukbhasuk
Chalit Pukbhasuk